City Hall station is a SEPTA subway station in Philadelphia. Located in Center City underneath City Hall, it serves the Broad Street Line. It is the busiest station on the line, serving 57,000 passengers daily. City Hall station is served by local, express, and special "Sport Express" trains. Entrances are located on the east and west sides of City Hall, as well as in the central courtyard.

Station layout

Interchanges 
A free interchange is available between all of the subway lines here, including the 15th Street stop for the Market–Frankford Line and all SEPTA subway–surface trolley routes (routes 10, 11, 13, 34 & 36).

The station is connected to the Center City Concourse, a system of underground passageways, which connects to Suburban Station, thus providing access to SEPTA Regional Rail.  City Hall Station is also connected to the Broad Street Line's Walnut–Locust Station, which in turn is connected to PATCO Speedline's 12–13th & Locust Station, and 15–16th & Locust Station. However, no free interchange is available to any of these stations. This is one of the two stops along the Broad Street subway not under Broad Street, with the other one being Fern Rock Station.

ADA reconstruction 
As built, City Hall was an original station along the 1928 Broad Street Line, and was not designed for ADA accessible transfer between lines. In 2003, SEPTA rebuilt the station escalators at the connected 15th Street station on the Market–Frankford Line; for which a lawsuit was filed by the Disabled in Action of Pennsylvania, citing that renovating one critical component would require the rest of the station complex to be renovated, as per building code requirements. As such, SEPTA would be required to make the station ADA accessible. SEPTA and the City of Philadelphia had been proposing a US $100 million refurbishment of City Hall station, which included structural repairs, improvements in lighting and ventilation, aesthetic improvements, as well as ADA improvements. However, the project's progression had stalled due to lack of funds.

In November 2011, the Central Philadelphia Development Corporation awarded construction contracts totaling $50 million for the restoration of the Dilworth Park above the station, following the eviction of the Occupy Philly protesters occupying the area; the contract includes the accessibility improvements for the station. SEPTA awarded construction contracts for the improvements in January 2012.  The project consisted of a restoration of the plaza, creating a "gateway" to the SEPTA transit station and installing elevators connecting to the street and Market-Frankford platforms at 15th. The contract did not include any accessibility for the disabled to the Broad Street Line platforms, which are outside the plaza boundaries.  The total cost of the project has risen to $55 million, with most of the money coming from a federal grant, with additional contributions by the City of Philadelphia ($5 million), and non-profit organizations including the William Penn Foundation.  The project, originally to have been completed July 2014, had been delayed due to the necessity to deal with stairways, duct banks and pipes construction crews encountered, that did not appear in any blueprints.
The renovated Dilworth Park opened on September 4, 2014.

In 2013, the passage of PA Act 89 (Transportation Funding Law) has allowed SEPTA to move forward with the $147 million BSL/MFL station renovation. The reconstruction of 15th began in 2016, and was completed in 2018, with reconstruction of City Hall station began in 2019.

Gallery

References

External links 

City Hall Broad Street Line station (WorldNYCSubway.org)

SEPTA Broad Street Line stations
Railway stations in Philadelphia
Railway stations in the United States opened in 1928
Railway stations located underground in Pennsylvania